Dynamo Saint Petersburg may refer to:
BC Dynamo Saint Petersburg, a basketball team
FC Dynamo Saint Petersburg, a football club
HC Dinamo Saint Petersburg, a hockey team
JHC Dinamo Saint Petersburg, a team in the Junior Hockey League (Russia)

See also 
FC Dynamo-2 Saint Petersburg, a football club